Lillie's Bordello was a nightclub in Dublin, Ireland that operated between 1991 and 2019. As a high-end establishment, it was symbolic of the culture of the Celtic Tiger era (c. 1994–2007).

History
Lillie's opened in 1991 in the building, 1-2 Adam Court, at the northern end of Grafton Street, formerly occupied by Restaurant Jammet. It was initially owned by Gerry O'Reilly.

Dave Egan bought Lillie's in 1996. A IR£2 million revamp took place in 2000. A fire damaged the building in February 2001.

Valerie Roe managed the club until 2006.

It was put on sale again in 2011, and acquired by the Porterhouse Group. Lillie's closed in January 2019, with many describing it as the "end of an era."

Name and style
The club was named for Lillie Langtry (1853–1929), and the name bordello was intended to evoke the Victorian era, when Grafton Street was a notorious red-light district. It featured plush Victorian red velvet decor, and a "library" area accessible only to VIPs with a special key.

Clientele
Most major celebrities who visited Dublin also visited Lillie's, including Julia Roberts, The Rolling Stones, Enrique Iglesias, McBusted, Rihanna, the Republic of Ireland national football team, Michael Flatley, Bruce Springsteen and Puff Daddy. The professional wrestler Sheamus was doorman at Lillie's around the year 2000. Eurovision Song Contest winner Paul Harrington worked as a pianist at the club.

Successor
As of 2019, a music venue called Lost Lane operates on the site.

Cultural depictions
Ronnie Wood's 1992 album Slide on This featured a track called "Ragtime Annie (Lillie's Bordello)."

In the Ross O'Carroll-Kelly novel Should Have Got Off at Sydney Parade (2006), Ross and his friends purchase Lillie's.

Lillie's is also mentioned in Denis Hamill's Fork in the Road (2000).

References

Nightclubs in Dublin (city)
1991 establishments in Ireland
2019 disestablishments in Ireland